The Rothorn Hut is an alpine hut, located above Zermatt in the canton of Valais. It is located at a height of 3,198 metres above sea level, at the foot of the Zinalrothorn. It can be accessed via the Trift valley by a trail from Zermatt.

See also
List of buildings and structures above 3000 m in Switzerland

References
Swisstopo topographic maps

External links
Official website

Zermatt
Mountain huts in Switzerland
Buildings and structures in Valais
Mountain huts in the Alps